Paurodontidae is a family of Late Jurassic to Early Cretaceous mammals in the order Dryolestida. Remains of paurodontids have been found in the United States, Britain, Portugal, and Tanzania. The group likely represents a paraphyletic group of basal non dryolestid dryolestidans. Paurodon has been suggested to have been a specilast feeder on earthworms due to the morphology of its teeth closely resembling that of the golden mole genus Amblysomus.

References

Dryolestida
Late Jurassic mammals
Kimmeridgian first appearances
Early Cretaceous extinctions
Prehistoric mammal families